Ballyclare High School is a co-educational, non-denominational grammar school in Ballyclare, County Antrim, Northern Ireland.  There are approximately 1,200 pupils at the school, taught by around 80 teachers.

History
The school was opened in the 1890s in the village of Doagh, a few miles south-west of Ballyclare.  In 1904 it moved to Ballyclare itself, and in 1930, the school finally moved to its current premises on the Rashee Road in the town. In 2006, the school was awarded Investor in People.

Sport
The Medallion (under 15) team won the Medallion Shield in 1990 when Coleraine Academical Institution were beaten 8-4 in the final at Ravenhill. The subsidiary Medallion Plate competition has been won four times in 1992, 1997, 1999 and 2003. The 1st XV won the Ulster Schools' Cup in 1973 and were runners up in 2012 to Royal Belfast Academical Institution. The 2012 team was coached by Mr D Soper and Mr G Shaw.

In boys' hockey, the school won the Burney Cup in 1931 and 1935. and also winning the Prior shield in 2012. 

In 2012 the senior girls 1st XI won the Ulster Senior Schoolgirls' Cup. The team was coached by Dr. Michelle Rainey and featured future Ireland and Scottish internationals including 2018 Women's Hockey World Cup silver medallist, Zoe Wilson, who scored the winner, aged 14.
Goalkeeper Lucy Camlin went on to gain 25 caps as a Scottish International and has uniquely won both Senior Scottish and Irish League & Cup Doubles with Edinburgh club Watsonians and Ulster club Pegasus respectively

Uniform 
Uniform is compulsory at Ballyclare High School. All pupils wear a blazer - black for boys and navy for girls - with the school logo emblazoned on a pocket on the left. Special Emblems are worn by students who have received awards from the school, and those who represent the school for Ulster or Ireland may be awarded an "honours blazer" - this is a red blazer with an honours pocket.

Ties must be worn for all pupils. In first to fifth year, ties are diagonal stripes of the school's colours, red and navy.  In Lower Sixth, pupils wear a tie that is mostly navy with intermittent, thin red stripes as well as a representation of the Ballyclare Mill which can be seen in the school's emblem.  The Upper Sixth tie  is similar to the first to fifth form tie, with a similar mill emblem to the Lower Sixth tie.

Notable former pupils

School leadership 
Principals:
 1902-1923: Catherine Aiken
 1923-1939: Arthur Foweather
 1939-1966: R E Russell
 1966-1970: Joseph Williams
 1970-1971: Herbert Mudd (acting principal)
 1971-1990: G C G Millar
 1990-2000: Robert FitzPatrick
 2000–2015: David Alexander Knox
 2015–Present: Dr Michelle Rainey

References

External links 
 Ballyclare High School website
 Old Ballyclarians Association website

Grammar schools in County Antrim
Ballyclare